The 1963 European Figure Skating Championships were held in Budapest, Hungary from February 5 to 10, 1963. Elite senior-level figure skaters from European ISU member nations competed for the title of European Champion in the disciplines of men's singles, ladies' singles, pair skating, and ice dancing.

Results

Men

Ladies

Pairs

Ice dancing

References

External links
 results

European Figure Skating Championships, 1963
European Figure Skating Championships, 1963
European Figure Skating Championships
International figure skating competitions hosted by Hungary
International sports competitions in Budapest
1960s in Budapest
February 1963 sports events in Europe